Mirko Plantić  (born 15 January 1985) is a Croatian footballer.

Career
He had a spell with Austrian 4th tier side SV Sierning in 2012.

References

External links
 
Profile at 1hnl.net 
National team stats at Croatian Football Federation website 

1985 births
Living people
Footballers from Zagreb
Association football defenders
Croatian footballers
Croatia youth international footballers
Croatia under-21 international footballers
NK Varaždin players
FC Chornomorets Odesa players
NK Croatia Sesvete players
NK Križevci players
FC DAC 1904 Dunajská Streda players
KF Vllaznia Shkodër players
NK Međimurje players
NK Istra 1961 players
Croatian Football League players
Slovak Super Liga players
Kategoria Superiore players
Austrian Landesliga players
Croatian expatriate footballers
Expatriate footballers in Ukraine
Croatian expatriate sportspeople in Ukraine
Expatriate footballers in Slovakia
Croatian expatriate sportspeople in Slovakia
Expatriate footballers in Albania
Croatian expatriate sportspeople in Albania
Expatriate footballers in Austria
Croatian expatriate sportspeople in Austria
Expatriate footballers in Switzerland
Croatian expatriate sportspeople in Switzerland
Expatriate footballers in Germany
Croatian expatriate sportspeople in Germany